Cornelis Wijnand (Cees) Lute (13 March 1941 – 9 October 2022) was a Dutch cyclist.

Lute died in October 2022 in Alkmaar, at the age of 81.

Major results

1959
1st Dwars door Gendringen
1960
1st Dwars door Gendringen
1st Omloop der Kempen
1st Stage 5 Olympia's Tour
1961
1st Stages 5 & 6 Olympia's Tour
1962
1st Omloop der Kempen
1964
1st Stage 19 Giro d'Italia
1st Overall Tour de Picardie
1965
1st Stage 4 Four Days of Dunkirk
1967
1st Stage 4 Giro di Sardegna
2nd Amstel Gold Race

References

1941 births
2022 deaths
Dutch male cyclists
People from Castricum
Cyclists from North Holland
Giro d'Italia stage winners